Kouklioi is a village in the former municipality of Ano Kalamas, Ioannina regional unit, Epirus, Greece. Since the 2011 local government reform it is part of the municipality of Pogoni. Population 407 (2011).

References

 https://web.archive.org/web/20130122144343/http://www.echorama.gr/selides/koyklioi.html

Populated places in Ioannina (regional unit)